Harry Hyman (born 1956 in Harrow, United Kingdom) is a British property entrepreneur. In 1994 he founded Primary Health Properties, a company based on the idea of purchasing primary health care premises and leasing them back to NHS General Practitioners through property investment. The company is part of the FTSE 250 and operates more than 480 medical centers.

References

English businesspeople
Living people
1956 births
People from Harrow, London
Alumni of Christ's College, Cambridge